Salma Phillips is a TV host, a writer and presenter from the northern part of Nigeria. Her full name is Ummu Salma Nabila Phillips. She is popularly known as the face of northern television. She obtained a diploma in law from the University of Jos, Nigeria and also a BSc. in law from the Rivers State University of Science and Technology, Port Harcourt. Her dream was to be a correspondent for CNN.

Background

Salma is half Fulani and half Calabari from the northern part of Nigeria and a lover of hip hop music.

Career

Salma graduated in law at the University of Jos, Nigeria, and also received BSc in law from the University Science and Technology, Port Harcourt. Salma and Aṣa, a notable Nigerian musician, attended the same college. On 7 February 2016, she started the Salma Show with a focus on topical issues. According to BellaNaija she said:  "Being a talk show host is a dream come true for me. I've always wanted to have a platform where I can air my views on topics that I'm passionate about. This journey started 3 years ago when I shot my pilot episode, amid a lot of setbacks and discouragement. I was determined to give whatever it takes to succeed. It feels great to finally see it coming together." Her role models include Oprah Winfrey, Christiane Amanpour, Funmi Iyanda and Femi Oke.

References

Living people
Nigerian writers
21st-century Nigerian women writers
Nigerian television presenters
Rivers State University alumni
Nigerian television talk show hosts
University of Jos alumni
Nigerian Fula people
1984 births
Nigerian women television presenters